Village Health Works (VHW) is a non-governmental organization operating in a rural area of southwestern Burundi. The organization was founded in 2007 by Deogratias Niyizonkiza, a Burundian-born American humanitarian.

VHW has expanded since its founding in 2007 to include programs in health care, education, nutrition, and community engagement. The campus now features a teaching hospital, the Kigutu Hospital and Women's Health Pavilion, and the Kigutu International Academy.

References 

Medical and health organisations based in Burundi
Educational charities
2000s establishments in Burundi
Organizations established in 2007